Neverland is a fantasy miniseries that aired on the Syfy network (United States) on December 4 and 5, 2011, and Sky Movies (United Kingdom) on December 9 and 16 December on Zee Cinema (India), written and directed by Nick Willing. It is a prequel to the story of Peter Pan.

Plot
In London, England 1906, thief James "Jimmy" Hook assembles a gang of juvenile street thieves to help him steal a strange glowing orb from an antique store. While carrying out the theft, Hook and the boys vanish. Only Peter, who had been assigned to play lookout, is left. Believing it was a bomb and his friends are dead, Peter takes the orb and returns home.

A man arrives asking for Hook, and Peter decides to follow him, hoping to get information about why Jimmy was hired to steal the orb. He is caught, and introduced to Dr. Richard Fludd, who explains that Hook and the boys are not dead, but have been transported to another world. Peter returns home, where he hits the orb, determined to find his friends and bring them home.

Meanwhile, Hook and the boys find themselves in a strange land and are quickly captured by a band of pirates, led by Captain Elizabeth Bonny. Bonny shows Hook magical dust that comes from the tree spirits that live on the island. The dust gives the power of flight, but she only has a small vial and wants Hook's help in getting more.

Peter finds himself in the middle of a forest, and is reunited with Fox, who managed to avoid being captured. The boys make friends with the natives and meet the chief's daughter, Aaya. They learn that the natives protect the tree spirit colony from the pirates. Peter and Fox rescue their friends from the pirates. Fox is killed during the ensuing fight.

Upon returning to the Native village, a tribal elder shows Peter a painting depicting a scene from a dream they've both had. Aaya  recognizes it as a place near their hunting grounds. Peter decides to find the place, hoping to discover a way to return to London. Upon arrival, they meet Dr. Fludd, the royal alchemist for Queen Elizabeth I. He explains that he discovered a planet where time stands still and created the orb as a way of transporting people there. While they plot a way to return Peter and the boys back to London, they are interrupted by the pirates, who kill Fludd, take the orb, and stab Peter. Tinker Bell brings Peter to be healed by the tree spirits in their magical mineral pool.

Hook tells Peter he wants to go back to London and persuades Peter to show him the mountain passage and the mineral pool. Once they reach the passage, Jimmy betrays Peter and reveals that the pirates followed them. Bonnie immerses herself in the mineral dust, but since only the innocent can use the pool, Bonnie instead burns to death and Hook takes over as captain. Furious, Hook reveals with rage to Peter that he was once engaged to his mother and killed his father when he found out about their affair. The tree spirits, angry that Peter lead Hook to them, erase Peter's memory. Tinker Bell defends Peter and is ostracized from her people.

The Lost Boys restore Peter's memory and he leads them to the pirates in the hopes of finding the orb. Peter follows Hook to the orb, while the Indians arrive and fight the pirates. Peter duels with Hook, while Aaya leads the Lost Boys against the pirates. While fighting, Tinker Bell is badly injured. Peter finds the orb, but is unable to escape before the cave collapses. At the end of a sword fight, Peter cuts off the Hook's hand, and a crocodile swallows it, along with Peter's father's watch, which Hook had stolen after murdering him. Hook asks Peter to kill him, but he refuses because he's not like him.

Some time later, the boys are living with the Natives when they are surprised to see Peter and Tinker Bell reappear. He tells them that he managed to activate the orb before the cave collapsed, returning to London. He stole the London orb, and hid it so no one else can use it, before activating it one last time to return to Neverland. Curly suddenly points out to Peter that his shadow is missing, thus leading into the events of the original story.

Cast

 Charlie Rowe as Peter
 Rhys Ifans as Jimmy Hook
 Anna Friel as Captain Elizabeth Bonny
 Charles Dance as Dr. Richard Fludd
 Q'orianka Kilcher as Aaya
 Bob Hoskins as Mr. Smee (Hoskins also portrayed the character in the 1991 film Hook) (final television role)
 Keira Knightley as Tinker Bell (voice only)
 Charlotte Atkinson as Tinker Bell
 Raoul Trujillo as Holy Man
 George Aguilar as Kaw Chief
 Cas Anvar as Gentleman Starkey
 James Ainsworth as Tootles
 Patrick Gibson as Curly
 Lorn Macdonald as Fox
 Thomas Patten as Twins
 Brandon Robinson as Slightly
 Chase Willoughby as Nibs

Production
Film production took place in Swords, Dublin, Ireland and Genoa, Italy.

References

External links
 
 

2010s American television miniseries
Television series about pirates
Television shows based on British novels
Television shows based on plays
Peter Pan television series
2011 in American television
Films set in 1906
British fantasy television series
Peter Pan films